Iván Jacinto Hurtado Angulo (born 16 August 1974) is an Ecuadorian politician and former professional footballer who played as a centre back. With 168 international appearances for Ecuador between 1992 and 2014, he was the most capped South American male footballer of all time before Lionel Messi overtook him during the 2022 FIFA World Cup, and the 17th-most-capped male international footballer.

Club career
Hurtado started his career with the small club of his hometown, Esmeraldas Petrolero, at the age of 16. A year later he moved on to one of Ecuador's biggest clubs in Guayaquil, Emelec, and had two stellar seasons, including two championships with the club, in one of them he scored the championship goal with a free kick he executed.

His excellent play warranted a switch to the Mexican leagues where he even further developed his defending techniques and his intelligent reading of the game. Ivan made a big impact in his first club, Celaya, where he led them to the Mexican league finals. He then moved to Tigres. He then moved on to the La Liga in Spain playing for Real Murcia.
After a mostly successful spell with Pachuca in Primera División de México, he moved on to Al Arabi in the Qatari League, impressing many over there.

After the FIFA World Cup in Germany, where Hurtado shone, it was reported that high-profile clubs such as English Premier League's Wigan Athletic, and Spanish La Liga's Recreativo Huelva and Villarreal were highly interested in him. However none of these rumors were accurate, and after spending six more months with Al Arabi, Hurtado moved to Colombia where he played for Atlético Nacional, he led the defence of the team, becoming captain in the back-to-back titles in 2007. In mid-2009, he returned to Deportivo Quito for the remainder of their season.
In 2011, he returned to play for Barcelona SC for one year, then he finished his career with Grecia in 2012.

International career
Hurtado holds the record as the youngest Ecuadorian to play for his country at just 17 years and 285 days. He has appeared in more FIFA World Cup qualification matches than any other player in history, and also held the record for most overall international caps by South American player until it was surpassed by Lionel Messi in December 2022. Hurtado was one of the key players who played a major role in securing a first ever World Cup berth for Ecuador in 2002. He had such an impressive tournament, that he was appointed to succeed former Ecuadorian star Alex Aguinaga to be the captain of a new generation of an ever-improving Ecuador side.

His best performances came in Ecuador's dream tournament in the 2006 FIFA World Cup. His defence left stars such as Polish forward Jacek Krzynowek, Costa Rican striker Paulo Wanchope, and English players Wayne Rooney, Joe Cole and Steven Gerrard desperate for goals. However, his form declined in a space of just six months. Nevertheless, he played for Ecuador at the 2007 Copa América, where his performance was very poor and criticised by many of his countrymen as the main reason for Ecuador's early elimination. Hurtado started the first two games against Chile and Mexico but was on the bench the whole game against Brazil.

Hurtado was called up for the first two 2010 World Cup qualifiers against Venezuela and Brazil, miserably losing both matches. As a consequence, he along with teammate Ulises de la Cruz, was excluded from the squad for the next round against Paraguay. Hurtado announced that this would be his final qualifying campaign and possibly the World Cup should Ecuador qualify. He stated, "There are a crop of talented and personable youngsters coming through now, and they deserve to have their chance like I had mine."

Playing style

Once a top class defender, with good technique and an ability to read the game, he is known in Spanish by his fans as "Bam Bam" for ramming the football with his feet like the Hanna-Barbera character does with his club. Ivan's playing style differs from his national partner, Giovanny Espinoza. While Espinoza is a very large player who uses his size, power and speed to overwhelm his adversary, Hurtado is considered to be very classy and often needs no contact at all to dispossess his adversary. Ivan also makes very clean tackles, organizes his back line as well as the best of them, and can even display confidence with the ball at his feet, and he can occasionally make surprising dashes forward.

A notable long and short passer, Hurtado has also taken free kicks well. Although not able to the bend the ball as well as other notable free kick takers, he has been known to strike the ball with such force that goalkeepers find it hard to judge and time his shots.

Political career

At the 2013 Ecuadorian general election, Hurtado was chosen as member of the National Assembly for the National Constituency. Hurtado serves as member of PAIS Alliance. Agustín Delgado and Ulises de la Cruz, former teammates of Hurtado at the national team, also serve for the Pais Alliance in the National Assembly.

Career statistics

International goals

Honours

Club
Emelec
Serie A: 1993, 1994

Atlético Nacional
Primera A: 2007

International
Ecuador
Canada Cup: 1999
Korea Cup: 1995

See also
 List of men's footballers with 100 or more international caps

References

External links

 International statistics at rsssf
 

1974 births
Living people
Sportspeople from Esmeraldas, Ecuador
Ecuadorian footballers
FIFA Century Club
Association football central defenders
Ecuador international footballers
Ecuadorian expatriate footballers
1993 Copa América players
1995 Copa América players
1999 Copa América players
2001 Copa América players
2002 CONCACAF Gold Cup players
2002 FIFA World Cup players
2004 Copa América players
2006 FIFA World Cup players
2007 Copa América players
La Liga players
C.S. Emelec footballers
Club Celaya footballers
Tigres UANL footballers
Querétaro F.C. footballers
Barcelona S.C. footballers
Real Murcia players
C.F. Pachuca players
Al-Arabi SC (Qatar) players
Al Ahli SC (Doha) players
Atlético Nacional footballers
Millonarios F.C. players
S.D. Quito footballers
Expatriate footballers in Colombia
Expatriate footballers in Mexico
Ecuadorian Serie A players
Categoría Primera A players
Liga MX players
Qatar Stars League players
Members of the second National Assembly (Ecuador)
PAIS Alliance politicians
Ecuadorian sportsperson-politicians
Ecuadorian expatriate sportspeople in Mexico
Ecuadorian expatriate sportspeople in Colombia
Expatriate footballers in Qatar
Ecuadorian expatriate sportspeople in Qatar